Yamalı Tövbeler is the third Maxi Single (EP/hybrid album) released in 2005 of the Turkish pop singer Mustafa Sandal.

Track listing
 Yamalı Tövbeler, 2005
"Yamalı Tövbeler"  –  – 3:45
"Yamalı Tövbeler (Akustik) (Bonova)"  –  – 4:34
"İsyankar (Panjabi MC Version) (Featuring Gentleman)"  –  – 4:05
"Kopmam Lazım (Retro Version)"  –  – 4:13
"Araba 2005 (Summer Tone)"  –  – 3:55
"Yamalı Tövbeler (Sense & Trance)"  –  – 5:19
"İsyankar (Kingstone's Senorita Remix)"  –  – 3:17
"Yamalı Tövbeler (Calisun) (Featuring İlhan Erşahin)"  –  – 4:32

Credits
 Music direction, arrangements: Emre Irmak
 Mixing: Serkan Kula
 Publishing: Polydor Island Group – a division of Universal Music GmbH 
 Photography: Zeynel Abidin

Music videos
 "Yamalı Tövbeler"

Trivia
A concert recording of this song was downloaded by many users one week before the official release

Notes 

Mustafa Sandal albums
2005 albums